Khom Gardan (also Romanized as Khomgardān; also known as Khomagdān) is a village in Baladeh Rural District, Khorramabad District, Tonekabon County, Mazandaran Province, Iran. At the 2006 census, its population was 22, in 7 families.

References 

Populated places in Tonekabon County